The 2014 Auto GP Series was the fifth year of the Auto GP, and the fifteenth season of the former Euroseries 3000. The championship began on 13 April in Marrakech, Morocco and finished on 19 October at the Autódromo do Estoril, after eight double-header rounds.

Despite missing two rounds during the season, Euronova Racing driver Kimiya Sato was crowned champion, after winning six races over the course of the season. Sato won the championship by 14 points over Tamás Pál Kiss, who was a three-time race winner during the 2014 season. Super Nova International's Markus Pommer completed the championship top three in third position, 27 points in arrears of Pál Kiss, having won races in Marrakech and Monza. Aside from them, other drivers to win races were Andrea Roda at the Red Bull Ring, Kevin Giovesi, who won at Le Castellet and Monza, Shinya Michimi, who won the season's final race at Estoril, while Michela Cerruti became the first woman to win a race in the series, with a victory at Imola. In the teams' championship, Super Nova International fended off Virtuosi UK in a tight title race, with Super Nova prevailing by just six points.

Teams and drivers

Race calendar and results
The provisional calendar for the 2014 season was released on 26 January 2014, with the series' definitive calendar released on 8 March 2014.

Championship standings
 Points for both championships were awarded as follows:

In addition:
 Two points were awarded for Pole position for Race One
 One point were awarded for fastest lap in each race

Drivers' championship

Teams' championship

References

External links
 

Auto GP
Auto GP
Auto GP